Adolfo Tunesi (August 27, 1887 – November 29, 1964) was an Italian gymnast who competed in the 1912 Summer Olympics. As part of the Italian team he won the gold medal in the gymnastics men's team, European system event as well as the bronze medal in the individual all-around.

References

External links
 
 
 
 

1887 births
1964 deaths
Italian male artistic gymnasts
Gymnasts at the 1912 Summer Olympics
Olympic gymnasts of Italy
Olympic gold medalists for Italy
Olympic bronze medalists for Italy
Olympic medalists in gymnastics
Medalists at the 1912 Summer Olympics